Greatest Hits, Volume II is the second compilation album by American country music artist Earl Thomas Conley. It was released on February 14, 1990 via RCA Records. The album includes the singles "Bring Back Your Love to Me" and "Who's Gonna Tell Her Goodbye".

Track listing

Chart performance

References

1990 compilation albums
Earl Thomas Conley albums
Albums produced by Emory Gordy Jr.
RCA Records compilation albums